Many places throughout the U.S. state of California take their names from the languages of the indigenous Native American/American Indian tribes. The following list includes settlements, geographic features, and political subdivisions whose names are derived from these indigenous languages.

Listings

Counties

 Inyo County – named after the eponymous Mono chief.
 Inyo Mountains
 Inyo Volcanic Chain
 Inyo National Forest
 Marin County – named after the eponymous Coast Miwok chief.
 Marin City
 Marin Creek
 Marin Headlands
 Marin Hills
 Marin Islands
 Modoc County – named after the Modoc people.
 Modoc National Forest
 Modoc Plateau
 Modoc Crater
 Mono County – from the Yokuts phrase monachi, meaning "those from the Sierra Nevada".
 Mono Village
 Mono Mills
 Mono Lake
 Napa County – from the Patwin phrase napo, meaning "home".
 City of Napa
 Napa River
 Napa Valley
 Shasta County – named after the Shasta people.
 Region of Shasta Cascade
 City of Shasta Lake
 City of Mount Shasta
 Village of Shasta
 Village of Little Shasta
 Mount Shasta
 Shasta Dam
 Shasta Lake
 Shasta River
 Siskiyou County – disputed origin; likely from a Chinook Jargon phrase meaning "bob-tailed horse".
 Siskiyou Mountains
 Siskiyou National Forest
 Solano County – named after the eponymous Suisun chief.
 Sonoma County – disputed origin; likely from a Pomoan phrase meaning "valley of the moon".
 City of Sonoma
 Sonoma Valley
 Sonoma Mountains
 Tehama County – from a Wintuan phrase meaning "high water".
 City of Tehama
 Mount Tehama
 Tuolumne County – disputed origin; likely from the phrase talmalamne of unknown origin, meaning "cluster of stone wigwams".
 Tuolumne City
 Tuolumne River
 Tuolumne Grove
 Tuolumne Meadows
 Grand Canyon of the Tuolumne
 Yolo County – from the Patwin phrase yo-loy, meaning "a place abounding in rushes".
 Village of Yolo

Settlements

 Acalanes Ridge
 Aguanga
 Ahwahnee
 Alleghany
 Aptos
 Azusa – from Tongva village "Azucsagna".
 Cabazon
 Cahuenga
 Camanche Village
 Camanche North Shore
 Cherokee – named after the Cherokee people.
 Cohasset
 Concow
 Honcut
 Jurupa Valley
 Klamath River
 Named after the Klamath River
 Laguna Niguel
 Lake Shastina
 Lompoc
 Malibu – from Ventureño "Umalibu, perhaps reflecting , "it (the surf) makes a loud noise all the time over there".
 Merrimac
 Milpitas
 Mi-Wuk Village
 New Chicago
 Nimshew
 Nipinnawasee
Nipomo
 Ojai
 Petaluma
 Piru
 Pismo Beach – from Chumash "Pismu" for "tar".
 Point Mugu
 Port Hueneme
 Poway – from Kumeyaay language.
 Rancho Cucamonga
 Saticoy
 Simi Valley – from Ventureño "Simiyi".
 Sisquoc
 Soquel
 Tehachapi
 Temecula – from Luiseño "Temeekunga".
 Tionesta
 Toluca Lake
 Topanga
 Tujunga
 Wyandotte
 Yucaipa
 Yeomet
 Yreka
 Zayante

Bodies of water
 Ahjumawi Lava Springs State Park – named after the Achowami people.
 Lake Cachuma
 Tahquitz Canyon and Creek, Falls, Peak, and Rock, named for Cahuilla legend Tahquitz
 Temescal Canyon, Creek, Mountains, and Valley

Islands
 Anacapa Island

Other
 Mojave Desert – named after the Mohave people.
 Yosemite National Park

See also 
 List of place names in the United States of Native American origin
 List of placenames of indigenous origin in the Americas
 Native Americans in the United States

References

Citations

Sources

 Bright, William (2004). Native American Placenames of the United States. Norman: University of Oklahoma Press. .

California
Native American origin in California
Lists of places in California